1-2-3-4 Go! Records is an American independent record label and retail store that specializes in punk rock and indie rock. Physical and Digital Music is distributed by Revolver. The label was founded in August 2001 in Seattle with the release of the Spitting Teeth 7" "Legacy of Cruciality". In December 2003 the label moved to Oakland, California. In March 2008 the label opened a retail record store in the Temescal neighborhood of North Oakland. The store initially focused on punk rock, indie rock, garage rock, and related genres but has since expanded to cover a wide variety of new and used records. The store hosts live music performances and occasional art shows. Frank Portman of The Mr. T Experience and Green Day have performed there.

In 2015 they opened a second retail store in the Mission District of San Francisco. Since opening the Oakland retail store, 1-2-3-4 Go! Records has won four Best of the East Bay awards from the East Bay Express. In 2009 it won the Best Punk Record Store award
and in 2008 it won the Best New Business award alongside its neighbor Manifesto Bicycles.

Roster
Shannon and the Clams
Buzzcocks
The Cute Lepers
Dead Sound
Destroy Boys
Dear County
Nobunny
The Dicks
Personal and the Pizzas
The Sandwitches

See also

 List of record labels

References

External links
1-2-3-4 Go! Records (official website)
1-2-3-4 Go! Records Facebook (Official Facebook page)

American independent record labels
Record labels established in 2001
Punk record labels
Companies based in Oakland, California